The Honda Ridgeline (YK1) is the first generation of pickup truck manufactured by Honda for North America. According to some automotive journalists, the first generation Ridgeline has some noteworthy designs, including:
 An in-bed trunk
 A dual-action tailgate
 A dent and corrosion resistant half-ton capacity composite bed
 An all-wheel drive truck with a fully independent suspension
 Ultra-low emissions
 A large interior for a mid-size pickup

The first generation Ridgeline went on sale in March 2005 as a 2006 model year vehicle with production ending in early 2015. According to Honda, the Ridgeline was not designed to steal sales from the more traditional trucks sold in North America, but was developed to "give the 18% of Honda owners who also own pickups a chance to make their garages a Honda-only parking area."  Despite the first generation Ridgeline's poor sales, according to the author of Driving Honda, this mid-size pickup was one of the more profitable vehicles for Honda with reported sales in over 20 countries.

Design

According to the author of The Car Design Yearbook, the Ridgeline was "Honda's first foray into the true heartland of the American automotive way of life—the pickup truck."  It was designed and engineered by a 37-member engineering team from Honda Research and Development (R&D) Americas, led by Gary Flint.  According to the author of Driving Honda, the automaker wanted to target buyers who were looking to transition out of sedans, minivans, and sport utility vehicles (SUV) into pickups.  In 2001, the engineering team began experimenting with their first development mule, an extended version of a first generation Acura MDX with a competitor's pickup bed integrated into the rear structure, which they called "the Hondarado."  After four years of development, the final design was revealed to the public as Honda's Sport Utility Truck Concept at the 2004 North American International Auto Show.  Later that same year, Honda unveiled a revised version of their pickup concept at the Specialty Equipment Market Association (SEMA) Show and announced the official name of the vehicle, the Ridgeline.  The production version of the Ridgeline was unveiled the following year at the 2005 North American International Auto Show.

According to Honda, construction of the Ridgeline starts with a fully boxed "four bone" "ladder-like frame" using 44% high-strength steel and seven high-strength steel crossmembers. This was coupled to "a unique suspension design with custom components," sheetmetal not shared with any other Honda product, and a 95% unique interior. The ladder-like frame, powertrain configuration, and four-wheel independent suspension provided space for designers to build storage solutions in, around, and on top of the frame. Starting at the front of the Ridgeline, engineers stamped a steel hood that supports a cold air intake system for the engine that draws outside air from above and in front of the radiator to support torque production as well as water fording. This hood design also shields the windshield wipers from the environment which are also heated to improve winter performance. Honda also constructed large side-view mirrors to support better visibility while towing; due to their size, Honda incorporated small vortex generators on top of the mirrors to reduce air turbulence. At the center of the truck, the C-pillar's buttress was specifically designed to help distribute large loads across the unibody frame and the cab so the truck could achieve its targeted payload and towing figures. Also, the C-pillar, rear roof section, and tailgate were designed to maintain good aerodynamics and reduce turbulence in the bed while maintaining driver visibility. This aerodynamic design helps shield the rear glass window so when it's opened at speed there is no buffeting or rainwater intrusion. The bed is built out of steel-reinforced sheet moulding composite (SMC)—developed by Continental Structural Plastics—which is dent resistant, corrosion resistant, ultraviolet light resistant, has a non-slip coating, and reduces weight by 30% over traditional sheet-metal. The SMC bed is supported by high-strength steel crossmembers (three under the bed and two in the rear cab wall) to safely secure and support heavy loads, even under conditions that would cause the SMC to fail or during collisions that would try to force a load into the cab.

Specifications

It includes the "industry's first" lockable, watertight, and drainable  in-bed trunk at the rear of the bed. It has  of ground clearance with approach, departure, and breakover angles of 24.5º, 22º, and 21º respectively.

The Ridgeline's bed is also equipped with four bed lights—one integrated into each C-pillar and one in each side-panel at the rear of the bed—that is designed to provide a minimum of ten lux of illuminance throughout the bed. According to Honda, the bed's dimensions, equipment placement, and indentations—what Honda calls guides—were designed with the hauling of off-road motorcycles or all-terrain vehicles in mind. 
Additionally, the forward section of the passenger-side bed wall has a hidden auxiliary tire mount that can accommodate a compact or full-size spare tire for times when access to the spare tire service tray, via the in-bed trunk, is impractical. The tailgate has a dual-action hinging system that allows it to be laid-down in the traditional manner or be swung open either 30º or 80º to the side.

Honda lists a  towing capacity for the Ridgeline while accommodating a  tongue weight and an additional  for people and gear.  All models were pre-wired for an electric trailer brake controller and a seven-pin or less trailer wiring harness.  Also, depending on trim level and model year, a class III tow hitch with a four-pin flat and/or seven-pin blade trailer wiring harness was either standard equipment or dealer installed options.

The first generation Ridgeline has a four-wheel independent suspension using upright springs and dampers with MacPherson struts in front and a multi-link trailing arm with twin-tube gas filled hydraulic shocks in the rear providing  front and  rear of total wheel travel.  It has a turning radius of  using an 18.5 : 1 variable power-assisted rack-and-pinion steering.  The Ridgeline has a traditional hydraulic braking system with four-wheel disc brakes using  ventilated front discs with floating twin piston calipers and  solid rear discs with floating single piston calipers and a "drum-in-hat" integrated emergency/parking brake.  The disc brakes are controlled via a four-channel anti-lock braking system with electronic brakeforce distribution and emergency brake assist.

Powertrain
The first generation Ridgeline is powered by a transverse mounted  60º V6 engine.  The aluminum block has thin-walled cast iron liners and has exhaust manifolds that are cast directly into the aluminum cylinder heads.  The Ridgeline's J-series engine also has:
 Belt-driven single overhead camshafts
 24-valves
 Variable valve timing and lift electronic control (VTEC)
 10 : 1 compression
 Aluminum variable-length intake manifold
 Programmed multi-point fuel injection (PFM-FI)

All first generation Ridgelines came equipped with a heavy-duty radiator, auxiliary transmission and power steering coolers, and dual 160 watt (W) radiator fans to support hauling and towing duties.  The Ridgeline also came equipped with a variable torque management four-wheel drive (VTM-4) system—co-developed with BorgWarner—that provides front-wheel drive for dry-pavement cruising and engages all-wheel drive to improve acceleration, stability, maneuverability, and off-road performance.  The VTM-4's electromagnetically driven clutch-operated differential can transfer up to 70% of available torque to the rear-axle when needed.  The VTM-4 system can also be electronically locked providing maximum torque to the rear wheels for better handling of adverse terrain or to assist the driver in becoming unstuck. Additionally, the first generation Ridgeline came equipment with a four-channel electronic stability control system—what Honda calls Vehicle Stability Assist (VSA)—that is designed to enhance control during acceleration, cornering, and collision-avoidance maneuvers and can be manually disabled to prevent undesirable throttle intervention in off-road conditions.

All these components work together to respond to the Ridgeline's electronic throttle that is also linked to the VTM-4 and VSA systems.  Honda's five–speed automatic transmission—also known as an automated manual transmission—used in the Ridgeline has a four–shaft, vs the traditional three, design with a flat three–stage torque converter and lock–up clutch that is managed by the PFM–FI's central processing unit.  A direct-control real–time pressure management system coordinates engine and transmission operation to minimize driveline shocks and a grade logic controller prevents gear hunting when ascending hills or when more engine braking is required.

The first generation  Ridgeline was built with a  fuel tank and is designed to run on unleaded gasoline with a minimum of 86 octane—also known as the Anti-Knock Index (AKI)—(2006 model year) or 87 AKI (all other model years). A powertrain control module and a block-mounted acoustic knock sensor work together to either retard or advance ignition timing to maximize engine performance with various AKI gasolines.

Equipment

In addition to the features described above, according to Car and Driver the United States (US) version of the 2006 Ridgeline's base trim model came with standard equipment not offered in its competition's base trim mid-size trucks of the same model year.  As you progress into more equivalent crew-cab, short-box, four-wheel drive mid-size trucks of that year, you still see features not found in the competition, such as:
  infotainment touchscreen navigation unit with a 160 W, seven-speaker, AM/FM/XM radio, and six-disc CD player
 Dual-zone climate control system with multiple front and rear independently controlled air vents
 Multi–function center console with telescoping armrest, three-tiered expandable storage with various organizers, two cup holders, and a 115 volt (V)/100 W alternating current (AC) power outlet inside
 Split 60/40 fold-up rear bench seat with fold-down center armrest, lower anchors and tethers for children (LATCH) system for three child safety seats with three adjustable head restraints, and a rear-passenger 12 V/10 ampere (A) direct current (DC) outlet
 Four rear-passenger cup holders (one in each rear-door and two in the center armrest)
 Two shopping bag holders
 Power sliding rear-window

For the US market, the first generation Ridgeline was produced in six different trim levels through its lifetime, starting in 2006 with the base model RT, followed by the RTS, and the RTL.  Additional trims—the RTX, Sport, and SE—were added and/or subtracted from the lineup over the first generation's lifespan.  The base model RT trim came with cruise control, power windows and locks with remote, six-speaker 100 W AM/FM/CD audio system, and more.  The RTX trim added a class III tow hitch, four and seven-pin trailer wiring harness, Hexagonal style black grille, and  gray painted aluminum alloy rims.  The Sport trim was similar to the RTX but had an exterior blackout treatment, fog lights, a saw-tooth style black grille,  polished aluminum alloy rims with back trim, and added some audio system features but did not come with a trailer wiring harness.  The RTS trim added interior amenities to the base model with an upgraded 160 W/seven-speaker/six-disc audio system, dual-zone automatic climate control, as well as  polished aluminum alloy rims, and more with later models coming equipped with full towing equipment.  The RTL trim was the leather bound top trim for most of the first generation Ridgeline's production with all of the amenities found in the other trims and added an optional moonroof,  infotainment touchscreen navigation unit and XM Satellite Radio.  The short lived SE trim took the RTL trim and made all of its optional equipment standard, added the Sport trim's exterior appearance as well as its blackout treatment, which continued onto the SE's interior.

For the Canadian market, the Ridgeline was produced in seven different trim levels throughout its production: DX, VP, LX, Sport, Special Edition, EX-L, and Touring.   Although there were differences in packaging between the US and Canadian trims, the only technical differences were the use of daytime running lights on all trims and model years, metric system gauges, and bilingual (English and French) voice recognition and navigation system.  The Canadian DX or VP trim were the base trim packages and were very similar to the RT.  The LX trim was the next in the lineup, sitting around the RTX.  The Canadian Sport trim was the third fanciest in the lineup and was very similar to the Sport trim sold in the US  The Special Edition trim was next in the lineup; although it shared the SE's exterior components and blackout treatment, its features put it around the RTS trim.  The EX-L or Touring trim were at the top of the lineup and were similar to the RTL and SE with a few exceptions.

For the Mexican market, only an RTL trim was available and had a few twists to its packaging that set it apart from its US and Canadian counterparts.  The Mexican RTL came equipped very similarly to the Canadian EX-L  However, unlike the EX-L, navigation was never a factory option.

For the Chilean market, the Ridgeline was sold in RT and RTL trims.  The Chilean RT was a mix between the Canadian DX and VP trims while the Chilean RTL consisted of options found in the early model Canadian EX-L trim.

Updates
From its introduction to its final production run, the first generation Ridgeline was offered in three to seven different exterior colors as well as one to three different interior colors depending on country, model year, and trim level.  All of the exterior colors were monotone with some black and/or chrome trim.  Interior colors—which rotated between olive, beige, gray, and black—were mated to specific exterior colors and trim levels.  Below is a sortable table of all exterior colors the first generational Ridgeline came with by model year and trim level in the US and Canada.

For the 2007 model year, the RTX trim package was introduced in the US market as a unique tow-ready version of the Ridgeline.  Also the RTL trim package was modified making the moonroof and XM Satellite Radio options standard equipment and its two-tone leather upholstery was redone with new monotone leather.  Honda also added a driver-side illuminated vanity mirror to all trim levels and removed the only interior color option available to buyers by deleting the olive interior choice from white painted Ridgelines, leaving only beige.

For the 2008 model year, the Ridgeline's interior was changed with the removal of their olive color, the replacement of two-tone fabric upholsteries with monotone versions, and the male voice on the RTL's navigation system was removed to increase space for more points of interest.  Additionally, the RTS and RTL trims where outfitted with more polished versions of their alloy rims.

For the 2009 model year, the Ridgeline received its first refresh with over 50 different changes, including exterior and interior updates as well as drivetrain improvements.  Some of the more noticeable changes were:

 New front-end with daytime running lights
 New solid-red taillights
 New rear step-bumper with integrated class III tow hitch
 Two additional bed cleats
 New instrument cluster and steering wheel—with all cruise control functions consolidated onto the steering wheel
 Multi-format—Pulse-Code Modulation (PCM), MPEG-1/2 audio layer III (MP3), and Windows Media Audio (WMA)—CD player
 Driver and front-passenger active head restraints and more...

Also, the H5 transmission was revised with the greatest difference found in third and fourth gears providing approximately 5% lower ratios. In the US, the RTX trim was removed from the lineup and the RTS trim gained a power-adjustable lumbar, an auxiliary 3.5mm Tip, Ring, Sleeve (TRS) stereo input jack, and a seven-pin trailer wiring harness while losing dual-zone climate control synchronization. The US RTL trim gained a seven-pin trailer wiring harness,  machine finished alloy rims, fog lights, and a 115 V/100 W AC inverter; if equipped with navigation, the US RTL also received a rearview camera displayed on the navigation screen, Class 2 Bluetooth with Honda's HandsFreeLink system and a multi-data/multilingual information display. For Canadians, a new lineup of trim levels were introduced that more closely resembled the US—moving from the LX and EX–L to the DX, VP, and EX–L trim packages—with the top trim receiving XM Satellite Radio for the first time.

For the 2010 and 2011 model years, with the exception of some exterior color changes, Honda made no updates to the Ridgeline.

For the 2012 model year, Honda put the Ridgeline through another refresh.  Honda introduced a new Sport trim for the US and Canadian markets with audio system updates such as: auxiliary 3.5mm TRS stereo input jack, steering-wheel mounted audio controls, and a blackout exterior package highlighted with a red "SPORT" grille badge.  Also, the Canadian EX-L trim was replaced with a new Touring package.  Additionally, a new grille was introduced for all but the Sport trim.  Additionally, new taillights were introduced. For Mexico, their RTL trim received the US and Canadian Sport trim's exterior package while retaining its Canadian EX-L interior.  All versions received aerodynamic improvements to the body and friction reduction measures were made to the engine, which improved city and highway fuel economy by 1 mpg‑us and 0.5 to 0.2 L/100 km, according to EPA and NRCan testing respectively.

With this addition, the digital compass in the RTL trim's rearview mirror was deleted. Pictorial evidence suggest the Chilean market received the 2012 updated taillights as well as the 2009  alloy rims for their RTL trim.

For the 2014 model year, Honda removed the VP trim from the Canadian lineup and added a new Special Edition package.  In the US, the SE trim was introduced surpassing the RTL as the top trim package.  Both the Canadian Special Edition and the US SE can be identified by their unique  polished alloy rims with black trim and a "SPECIAL EDITION" tailgate badge.

Comparisons

The Ridgeline is the first four-door pickup truck to earn the National Highway Traffic Safety Administration's (NHTSA) five-star safety rating for both front and side impact crash test performance and has the highest rollover resistance of any pickup NHTSA ever tested at 14.3%.  Also, the Insurance Institute for Highway Safety (IIHS) tested the Ridgeline and awarded the 2009, 2012, and 2013 model years with its "Top Safety Pick" award.

As depicted on MSN Autos' website, when one compares the first generation Ridgeline's advertised interior, passenger volume, and total payload with the other mid-size trucks of its era—the Toyota Tacoma, Nissan Frontier, Suzuki Equator, Dodge Dakota, Ford Explorer Sport Trac, Ford Ranger, and GM's Colorado/Canyon—the Ridgeline has more amenities, greater interior space, and greater hauling capacity than its competition.  However, when comparing the manufacturers' tow ratings the Ridgeline is at the bottom of its class.  Excluding these extremes, the first generation Ridgeline tends to fall in the middle of these mid-size trucks' published specifications.

In 2012, PickupTrucks.com conducted a mid-size truck challenge with six of the eight trucks listed above—minus the Dakota and Sport Trac—and the Ridgeline.  With the exception of a 2011 super-cab Ranger, all test vehicles were 2012 models and all had V6 engines except the Colorado with its LH8.  The head-to-head comparisons focused on numerous attributes including objective tests on 0-, 60–0, and quarter-mile (0.4 km) times with maximum payloads as well as empty beds, dynamometer tests, and real-world fuel economy comparisons.  Subjective tests included expert driver impressions, best value estimates, and an off-road course.  All tests and evaluations were conducted at the same place and time to minimize environmental impacts.  Of the seven mid-size trucks tested, the Ridgeline ranked third overall.  Of the objective tests, the Ridgeline had the highest scores for payload and real-world fuel economy while ranking lowest in torque delivery at the wheels; otherwise, the Ridgeline ranked in the middle of the other objective tests.  Of the subjective tests, the Ridgeline was judged second in expert impressions, third in best value, and last in the off-road course.

Marketing and sales
According to Automotive Design & Production, Honda was slow to enter the minivan and SUV markets, so "given that track record it is no surprise that Honda has just now [2005] gotten around to building a pickup truck."  According to Bloomberg News, Honda hoped buyers would find it an attractive alternative to large SUVs and conventional pickup trucks.

Some in the automotive press that have studied the Ridgeline, such as PickupTrucks.com, consider it "one of those odd vehicles."  They wrote, "The Ridgeline can't really do what most people who like trucks need it to do."  While AutoTrader.com wrote, "Sure, some homeowners and weekend warriors may actually need a 10,000-lb towing capacity, but the Honda Ridgeline is probably just right for most."  Motor Trend conducted a long-term road test of the 2006 Ridgeline and stated that they "fully expected the hard-cores to be outraged" suggesting they would proclaim "It's a modified minivan," it "didn't qualify as a truck because of its unibody chassis and transverse-mounted engine," and that "it looks funny."  After a year in their long-term fleet, Motor Trend stated "the Ridgeline has ultimately made a few converts among our car-loving staff, some of whom would never consider themselves fans of anything with a pickup bed."  They wrapped up their long-term review by stating that whatever their next long-term vehicle is, "it's likely not to be as versatile as the Ridgeline.  We'll miss this urban-suburban and mountain Swiss Army knife for sure."  Others in the automotive press, such as The Driver's Seat TV, had similar views and also call the Ridgeline, "the Swiss Army knife of trucks."  They also called the Ridgeline "the anti-truck"—due to Honda's lack of following the rules—and summarized their view by saying "the Ridgeline scores high on practicality but very low on image."

According to the Chicago Sun-Times, "Since its March [2005] debut, Honda's first pickup for the US market is slow to gain traction.  Nissan's full-size Titan pickup also has fallen short of sales targets in this all-American segment, which...is proving tough for outsiders to crack."  According to Bloomberg Business, early slow sales can partly be attributed to the expense of the vehicle, which some considered "over-priced."  Consequently, dealers began to discount the truck and sales increased.  Additionally, Honda gave the Ridgeline a facelift for 2009 and again in 2012, but sales remained "lackluster," according to AutoBlog.com.  During the time period of the Great Recession, Automobile Magazine wrote that Ridgeline sales "dropped by half from 2008 to 2010 and then fell another 40%" in 2011, possibly due, in part, to parts shortages created by the 2011 Tōhoku earthquake and tsunami.  Soon after, Honda posted "an open letter from the company's head of truck product planning, denying rumors that the Ridgeline would be dropped and insisting that a pickup truck will remain part of the company's portfolio."

The first generation Ridgeline ended production in early 2015.  According to Auto Trader, the automaker planned to continue production until the second generation Ridgeline was introduced; however, "slow sales of the truck have prompted the automaker to pull it sooner than expected."  Despite this, the Ridgeline was one of Honda's more profitable vehicles due in large part to the company's frugal nature that allowed them to develop and deploy the Ridgeline for under $250 million US dollars, half of what General Motors would normally pay.

Gallery

Awards
 North American Car, Utility, and Truck of the Year for 2006 
 Canadian Car of the Year and Best New Pickup for 2006
 Motor Trend 2006 Truck of the Year
 Car and Driver #1 mid-size truck for 2006,
 Autobytel 2006 Truck of the Year
 Sobre Ruedas ("On Wheels," a Latin American automotive magazine) 2005 Best Pick-up Truck
 J.D. Power and Associates Automotive Performance, Execution, And Layout (APEAL) Award for 2006–2008
 Popular Mechanics 2006 Automotive Excellence Award for functionality
 Society of Plastics Engineers 2006 Grand Award for the composite in-bed trunk
 NHTSA first four-door pickup to earn five-star safety rating
 IIHS Top Safety Pick award for 2009, 2012, and 2013
 SCORE Baja off-road race winner in the Stock Mini Class in 2008 and 2010

References

External links

 Honda Ridgeline Owners Club (ROC) forum
 The Story Behind The Honda Ridgeline's Wildly, Unusually Detailed Wikipedia Page

Ridgeline
Pickup trucks
All-wheel-drive vehicles
Goods manufactured in Canada
2010s cars
Sport utility trucks
Cars introduced in 2005
Motor vehicles manufactured in the United States